The sixth series of the British medical drama television series Casualty commenced airing in the United Kingdom on BBC One on 6 September 1991 and finished on 27 February 1992.

The final episode of the series was the only episode to be screened after Christmas; it had been scheduled for 20 December 1991 but was delayed by two months as its original airing date was the day before the third anniversary of the Lockerbie disaster in the Scottish borders in which 270 people had been killed.

Cast

Overview
The sixth series of Casualty features a cast of characters working in the emergency department of Holby City Hospital. The series began with 8 roles with star billing. Nigel Le Vaillant appears as specialist registrar and later, emergency medicine consultant Julian Chapman, while Mamta Kaash plays senior house officer Beth Ramanee. Derek Thompson continues his role as charge nurse Charlie Fairhead, and Cathy Shipton stars as sister Lisa "Duffy" Duffin. Patrick Robinson appears as staff nurse Martin "Ash" Ashford, while Ian Bleasdale and Caroline Webster portray paramedics Josh Griffiths and Jane Scott. Robson Green continues to portray porter Jimmy Powell.

Maureen Beattie, Adie Allen, Anne Kristen and Maria Friedman joined the show's main cast as staff nurse Sandra Nicholl, student nurse Kelly Liddle, receptionist Norma Sullivan and social worker Trish Baynes respectively. Allen and Kristen debuted in episode one, Freidman was introduced in episode three and Beattie began appearing in episode eleven. Allen departed the series in episode nine and Friedman left the cast in episode fifteen. Kaash and Green also left the series in episode fifteen.

Main characters 

Adie Allen as Kelly Liddle (episodes 1−9)
Maureen Beattie as Sandra Nicholl (from episode 11)
Ian Bleasdale as Josh Griffiths
Maria Friedman as Trish Baynes (episodes 3−15)
Robson Green as Jimmy Powell (until episode 15)
Mamta Kaash as Beth Ramanee (until episode 15)
Anne Kristen as Norma Sullivan (from episode 1)
Nigel Le Vaillant as Julian Chapman
Patrick Robinson as Martin "Ash" Ashford
Cathy Shipton as Lisa "Duffy" Duffin
Derek Thompson as Charlie Fairhead
Caroline Webster as Jane Scott

Episodes

References

External links
 Casualty series 6 at the Internet Movie Database

06
1991 British television seasons
1992 British television seasons